The 2012 IAAF World Half Marathon Championships was held in Kavarna, Bulgaria on 6 October 2012.

Detailed reports on the event and an appraisal of the results were given.

Complete results were published for the men's race, for the women's race, for men's team, and for women's team.

Medallists

Race results

Men's

Women's

Team results

Men's

Women's

Participation
An unofficial count yields the participation of 146 athletes from 41 countries.   Although announced, athletes from  did not show.

 (1)
 (1)
 (1)
 (4)
 (1)
 (1)
 (2)
 (8)
 (8)
 (3)
 (1)
 (1)
 (2)
 (6)
 (2)
 (6)
 (10)
 (7)
 (1)
 (2)
 (1)
 (10)
 (10)
 (2)
 (1)
 (6)
 (2)
 (5)
 (2)
 (1)
 (4)
 (2)
 (6)
 (3)
 (1)
 (2)
 (4)
 (3)
 (10)
 (1)
 (2)

See also
 2012 in athletics (track and field)

References

External links
IAAF Website
IAAF WORLD HALF MARATHON CHAMPIONSHIPS - KAVARNA 2012 - FACTS & FIGURES

World Half Marathon Championships
World Half Marathon Championships
World Athletics Half Marathon Championships
International athletics competitions hosted by Bulgaria